Ocean Wind is a proposed utility-scale offshore wind farm to be located on the Outer Continental Shelf approximately  off the coast of Atlantic City, New Jersey. It is being developed by Ørsted US Offshore Wind in conjunction with Public Service Enterprise Group (PSE&G). Construction is planned to begin in the early 2020s; expected commissioning is in 2024. The closed Oyster Creek Nuclear Generating Station and B.L. England Generating Station would provide transmission points for energy generated by the wind farm. At 1,100 MW, it will be the largest producer of wind power in New Jersey and largest offshore wind farm in the United States.

Background
In the United States, federal waters commence 3 nautical miles offshore. The U.S. Bureau of Ocean Energy Management awarded leases for offshore wind sites in 2015. The rights were later acquired by DONG Energy, which became Ørsted, parent of Ørsted US Offshore Wind. The company was selected by the New Jersey Board of Public Utilities (NJBPU) in June 2019. PSE&G later joined the project. 

There is only one other utility-scale wind farm in the state, the 5-turbine Jersey-Atlantic Wind Farm. Two other projects which would provide wind power to New Jersey are Garden State Offshore Energy, Offshore Delaware in WEA OC-A 482 North opposite Rehoboth Beach, also by Ørsted US Offshore Wind, and Atlantic Shores Wind Farm in Offshore New Jersey WEA OCS-A 0499 -- off the coast of Jersey Shore (mostly opposite Ocean County from Atlantic City north to Barnegat Light) by EDF Renewables/Shell. Another potential WEA is Offshore New Jersey/New York on the west/south side of Hudson Canyon 21 miles offshore opposite Monmouth County.

In September 2020, New Jersey officials delayed the project citing concerns about economic benefits of offshore wind, including construction of monopoles and negative effects on the fishing industry.

In December 2020, Ørsted put in a bid for Ocean Wind 2, a second installation of wind turbines in the same area, which the NJBPU selected in June 2021. It will be an additional 1,148 MW, for a total energy capacity at the site of 2,248 MW.

Design, construction and staging

Turbines
Haliade-X 12 MW wind turbines produced by GE Wind Energy will be used. As many as 99 will be constructed. As of 2019, they had the highest capacity of turbines being produced.

On-shore staging center
Ørsted U.S. Offshore Wind is also partnering with Tradepoint Atlantic, based in Port of Baltimore, to create a 50-acre staging center for on-land assembly, storage and loading out into deep waters for projects along the East Coast.

The Port of Paulsboro could become the site for the production the monopile foundations for the turbines.

On-shore interconnection
In September 2019, Ocean Wind, with the approval of the New Jersey Board of Public Utilities, secured the capacity interconnection rights to bring the power generated by the wind farm on-shore at Oyster Creek Nuclear Generating Station in Lacey Township, a 619-megawatt nuclear power plant which was shut down in September 2018. It can use the existing power infrastructure of the plant, after some upgrades, to connect to the regional transmission grid. Ocean Wind is petitioning the Board to approve a second interconnection point at the former coal-fired B.L. England Generating Station through Ocean City, New Jersey.

Impact on marine life and fisheries
The wind farm will be built in prime fishing areas. Its impact on fisheries industry remains unclear, though there are some concerns and recommendations. Some have asked for a 5-year moratorium on construction until impact on fishing industry is further studied.

See also
Anbaric Development Partners
Skipjack Wind Farm
List of offshore wind farms
List of offshore wind farms in the United States
East Coast of the United States
Territorial waters

References

External links 

Wind farms in New Jersey
Atlantic County, New Jersey
Cape May County, New Jersey
Proposed wind farms in the United States
Offshore wind farms in the United States